Reinhold Wittig (born 1937) is a prolific award-winning board game designer and geologist from Germany. He is credited as the designer of over 125 board games or game items.

References

External links
 Reinhold Wittig wikipedia entry (German)
 Reinhold Wittig: boardgamegeek.com designer entry

1937 births
Living people
Board game designers
German designers
20th-century German geologists